Tunisia competed at the 1984 Summer Olympics in Los Angeles, United States.  The nation returned to the Olympic Games after participating in the American-led boycott of the 1980 Summer Olympics.

Athletics

Men
Track & road events

Boxing

Men

Judo

Men

Swimming

Women

Volleyball

Men's Team Competition

Preliminary round

Pool A

|}

|}

Final round

9th place match

|}

Team Roster

 Faycal Laridhi
 Mohamed Barsar
 Rachid Bousarsar
 Ghazi Mhiri
 Msaddek Lahmar
 Mounir Barek 
 Walid Boulehya
 Slim Maherzi 
 Chebbi Mbarek
 Yassine Mezlini
 Aziz Ben Abdallah
 Adel Khechini

Weightlifting

Men

References
Official Olympic Reports

Nations at the 1984 Summer Olympics
1984
1984 in Tunisian sport